Susquehanna University is a private liberal arts college in Selinsgrove, Pennsylvania. Its name is derived from the original Susquehannock settlers of the region. Founded in 1858 as a missionary institute, it became a four-year liberal arts college in 1895. It is affiliated with the Evangelical Lutheran Church in America. Susquehanna is classified among "Baccalaureate Colleges: Arts & Sciences Focus", though it also has a business school, master's degrees in education and joint-degree programs in engineering and for a Master of Business Administration. It also offers the only bachelor's degree in luxury brand marketing and management in the U.S. 

The academic programs are within the four schools of the Arts, Humanities, Natural and Social Sciences, and the AACSB International-accredited Sigmund Weis School of Business. Susquehanna University enrolls more than 2,200 undergraduate students from 33 states and 23 countries, and maintains a student-to-faculty ratio of 13 to 1. Most students are required to live on campus all four years and as of 2012, all students participate in a cross-cultural study away or service-learning experience known as the GO Program.

History

Founding and early years

The institution was founded by Benjamin Kurtz, its first president. Having already assisted in the founding of Gettysburg Seminary, Kurtz wanted to create another institution to expand the form of American Lutheranism that he advocated.

Kurtz's mission was to “educate men for the gospel ministry … who cannot take a full course of training adapted to their age and circumstances; a course so thorough in theology as will qualify them to be able and faithful ministers of Christ.” The American Lutherans of the Evangelical Lutheran Church in Selinsgrove, Pennsylvania, provided 50 students, pledged $22,000, and offered the provisional use of its church facilities. However, they stipulated that the institute be expanded to a junior college and that a sister college for women also be formed.

On September 1, 1858, the Missionary Institute of the Evangelical Lutheran Church and Susquehanna Female College were established and legally recognized 23 days later. It had two departments: the theology department and the classical department. In 1873, the sister college disbanded and the institute became co-educational. 

The institute officially became known as Susquehanna University in 1895.

20th century

The 20th century brought many changes. The institution had recently begun offering bachelor degrees and changed its name to reflect that. In 1903, the board approved Susquehanna’s colors, orange and maroon.

By the 1920s, student enrollment skyrocketed, accommodations were refurbished and the campus expanded, and academic departments and offerings were enhanced.

Academics

Susquehanna University is a private, non-profit liberal arts college in central Pennsylvania devoted primarily to undergraduate education. It is accredited by the Middle States Commission on Higher Education. Susquehanna has a student-to-faculty ratio of 13:1 with 90% of full-time faculty holding a doctorate or highest equivalent degree.

The institution offers more than 100 majors, minors and programs and allows students to design their own major, complete a double degree, or start undeclared. Susquehanna offers pre-professional programs in pre-law, pre-veterinary medicine and teaching, and coordinates with Thomas Jefferson University for allied health, Temple University for dentistry and Case Western Reserve University, Columbia University, and Washington University in St. Louis for 3+2 dual-degree engineering programs. It has articulation agreements with the University of Nicosia in Cyprus that offers an accelerated path to earn a Master of Business Administration degree and with Capital University Law School to pursue a Doctorate of Law. In 2016, an average of 96% of graduates were enrolled in graduate school or employed within six months of graduation.

Organization and administration

Susquehanna University consists of four schools: School of the Arts, School of Humanities, School of Natural and Social Sciences, and the Sigmund Weis School of Business. 

Susquehanna University is governed by the president, a governing board of trustees, and a team of administrators.

Rankings

GO Program

The GO Program, as part of a school policy adopted in 2009, requires all Susquehanna students go off-campus for cross-cultural learning. Students have a choice between GO Short programs of 2–3 weeks or semester-long GO Long programs. In 2013, the GO Program was awarded the Andrew Heiskell Award for Innovation in International Education

Campus

The Susquehanna University campus spans  in Selinsgrove, Pennsylvania. There are more than 50 buildings on campus, primarily in the style of Georgian architecture. The campus has four buildings that are Leadership in Energy and Environmental Design-certified (LEED) by the U.S. Green Building Council: two residence halls, the Natural Sciences Center, and the Admission House. 

Kurtz Lane, named after the founding president, is a pedestrian way that runs through the center of campus. A portion of the lower lane is lined with gingko trees.

Students are guaranteed housing all four years, and nearly all students live on campus. Students can choose from traditional corridor-style halls, suites, townhouses, apartments, and family-style houses, each requiring no more than a 10-minute walk to class.

Selinsgrove and Seibert halls
Selinsgrove Hall is a -story brick structure constructed in 1858 in the Italianate style. The roof features a wooden cupola and the structure was previously featured on the institution's logo. Seibert Hall is a -story brick structure constructed in 1902 in a restrained Colonial Revival style. Both Selinsgrove Hall and Seibert Hall, were listed on the National Register of Historic Places in 1979.

Admission House
In 2017, the institution dedicated a $7 million space to welcome prospective students and families. According to the Susquehanna's website, Admission House was funded through contributions from the board of trustees. Unlike most other buildings on campus, the Admission House has a white facade instead of a naturally red-brick exterior. The  building was designed by architect Peter Bohlin of Bohlin Cywinski Jackson as a modern take on a barn to pay tribute to central Pennsylvania’s agricultural tradition, even though the institution does not offer an agriculture academic program. 

The building received LEED certification with design elements that include: stormwater management and control, reduced water usage, water-efficient landscaping, optimized light control and energy performance, and indoor chemical and pollutant-source control. It also received the Award for Excellence from the American Institute of Architect’s Northeastern Pennsylvania chapter.

Apfelbaum Hall

Apfelbaum Hall was built in 1999 and houses the Sigmund Weis School of Business and the communications department.

Business students get hands-on learning in a student investment center that serves as a functioning trading room with Bloomberg Terminals that allow students to monitor and analyze financial markets in real time, and place trades on the trading platform. Students oversee a real investment portfolio in a student managed investment fund with monies allocated from the Student Government Association. Communications students have access to production facilities, including an audio, video and graphics lab and a multi-camera television studio with a green screen. They also have access to professional-quality audio and video field equipment.

Natural Sciences Center
The Natural Sciences Center is a $32-million academic building that houses Susquehanna’s biology, chemistry, earth and environmental science, neuroscience, ecology, health care studies, and pre-professional  programs. It received Silver LEED certification. The  building was dedicated in 2010.

Solar array
In 2018, Susquehanna University completed a  solar array with WGL Energy to supply 30 percent of the institution's electricity. At the time, it was the largest college- or university-sponsored solar array in Pennsylvania, and one of the largest solar projects in the Commonwealth. The 12,000-panel array is estimated to produce over 5,300 megawatt hours (MWh) of electricity per year.

Student life 
Susquehanna University offers more than 150 student clubs and organizations, a variety of honor societies and professional organizations, and 11 Greek Life organizations.

Traditions
First-Year Students' Move In Day welcomes first-year students by sending orientation team members out to carry all new students' belongings into their dorm rooms. Many faculty and staff will also assist with the move-in process.

Thanksgiving Dinner is held prior to students leaving for Thanksgiving vacation. Students are served a turkey dinner by faculty, staff, and the president.

Christmas Candlelight Service is one of Susquehanna's most cherished traditions. Held in Weber Auditorium in early December, the service includes songs, readings, and prayers and finishes with everyone in attendance holding a lit candle.

Twas the Night Before Christmas in which students come to the campus center dressed in their pajamas and indulge in cookies and cocoa while enjoying a reading of the classic Christmas tale.

Clubs and organizations

Academic interest
There are a variety of academic interest clubs and organizations in the fields of business, education, music, sciences, foreign languages, and communications.

Publications and media

Writing majors have publication opportunities in the student-run Essay Magazine (for non-fiction) and Rivercraft (for fiction, poetry, and art) in addition to the writing departments' annual magazine, The Susquehanna Review, which seeks submissions from undergraduate writing majors internationally.
Topic specific student publications include Sanctuary, a literary magazine that features sci-fi and fantasy; Flagship, a publication that features creative work and photography that focuses on students' GO program experiences; and The Squirrel, a student-run newspaper that offers a humorous, critical, and constructive perspective on the news.
The institution's student-run newspaper, The Quill, covers campus events, activities, and athletics, and provides a forum for the opinions of members of the campus community.

WQSU, The Pulse, is the institution's 12,000-watt radio station, making it the third most powerful college radio station and the tenth most powerful non-commercial radio station in Pennsylvania. Broadcasts can be heard at a 70-mile radius, which is approximately one-third of the state of Pennsylvania. The station is operated by students, faculty and staff as well as community volunteers, and features a wide variety of music and talk programs including regularly scheduled Associated Press news broadcasts.
The Lanthorn is Susquehanna's yearbook that is available to students in hard copy in addition to being archived online.

Performing arts
In addition to the student-run clubs and organizations that focused on music and dance, many ensembles are sponsored and count toward major or elective credit requirements.

The University Choir, Chorale, and Chamber Singers are the three vocal performance groups open to all students by audition, and the instrumental offerings (many of which are also open to all students through an audition process) range from small ensembles to pep bands to the University Symphonic Band.

The theatre department also holds performances throughout the year with four large and several small productions a year.

Religious life
There are eight religious life organizations at Susquehanna. In addition, students as well as the general public have the opportunity to attend Lutheran services held Sunday mornings on campus.

Volunteering/service
There are ten clubs and organizations that focus on volunteering or service.

Student programs
Susquehanna's on-campus, student-run night club is TRAX. The facility offers a stage for live bands, comedians and other performers as well as a dance floor, bar, pool tables, an outside patio, and a DJ booth.

Susquehanna University also has Charlie's Coffeehouse, a student-run café on campus named after the institution's benefactor, Charles Degenstein. Students work as baristas, while the management team consists of five students who are responsible for the coffee shop's finances, marketing, programming, stocking, and managerial duties. This non-alcoholic venue offers a variety of programming every night of the week. Charlie's also works in partnership with the student activities committee to bring in outside entertainers and host movies before they are released to the general public.

Greek life
There are four NPC sororities: (Alpha Delta Pi, Kappa Delta, Sigma Kappa and Zeta Tau Alpha); five NIC fraternities: (Phi Mu Alpha Sinfonia, Tau Kappa Epsilon, Theta Chi, Pi Kappa Phi and Phi Mu Delta); and two NPHC organizations: (Sigma Gamma Rho and Phi Beta Sigma).

Athletics

Susquehanna competes in 23 varsity sports in Division III of the NCAA. All sports compete as part of the Landmark Conference with other Northeastern colleges. Cheerleading is Susquehanna's 24th varsity team.

The athletics complex includes a  field house, 3,500-seat Amos Alonzo Stagg Field at Doug Arthur Stadium, Douglas Arthur '49 Field, Clyde H. Jacobs Fitness Center, 1,100-seat Orlando W. Houts Gymnasium, a natatorium with a 25-yard swimming and diving pool, tennis courts, racquetball courts, and Sassafras Softball Field and a multipurpose field. 

In 2022, Susquehanna won the Landmark Conference President's Trophy for the best overall athletics program, which is based on conference regular-season and postseason competition. It was the fifth time Susquehanna won the trophy, tying it with Moravian University, as one of two conference teams to most often win the trophy since it was created in 2008. 

The football team competes in two annual trophy contests. The Goal Post Trophy goes to the winner of the annual football game with rival Juniata College. Susquehanna football also plays Lycoming College for the Amos Alonzo Stagg's hat (bronzed) trophy.

In October 2015, Susquehanna University's board of trustees elected to replace the Crusaders nickname and mascot. On April 2, 2016, the University announced River Hawks as the new nickname. “Benny the Hawk” was introduced on Oct. 29, 2016 as the new mascot.

Susquehanna offers club sports and intramural sports that are free to all students.

Notable alumni

Roger Blough - former chairman and CEO of U.S. Steel
Claude A. Buss - U.S. diplomat, professor at University of Southern California and Stanford University
Richard Caruso - founder and chairman of Integra Life Sciences
David A. Day - longest serving Lutheran missionary in Liberia
Tommy Dempsey - head men's basketball coach, Binghamton University
Richard Dorman - President of Westminster College
Puella Dornblaser - temperance activist
Adam Harris - representative for the 82nd District, Pennsylvania House of Representatives, 2003–present
Jay Feaster – former general manager of the Calgary Flames, current executive director of Community Hockey Development for the Tampa Bay Lightning.
Benjamin K. Focht - member of the U.S. House of Representatives from Pennsylvania, the Pennsylvania House of Representatives, and the Pennsylvania State Senate
H. B. Galbraith - former head football coach at University of Arizona
Chuck Gillin - bishop of the Reformed Episcopal Church
James Jordan - writer and conductor
Dick Kauffman - professional baseball player
David T. Little - American composer and drummer
Camilla Luddington - actress
Jackie McKeever - Tony Award-nominated singer and actress
Harold Norman Moldenke - botanist and taxonomist
Bob Mosher - television and radio script writer
Bill Muir - former American football coach
Paul Musser - professional baseball player
Merle Phillips - representative for the 108th District, Pennsylvania House of Representatives, 1980–2010
Ashley L. Shade - Director of Research at the Institute of Ecology and the Environment within Le Centre National de la Recherche Scientifique.
John Strangfeld - former chairman and CEO of Prudential Financial

Notable faculty and administration

Tom Bailey - Author, editor, and former creative writing professor.
Rick Benjamin (conductor) - Adjunct professor of music at Susquehanna University and conductor of Paragon Ragtime Orchestra
Gary Brown - Former professional football player and former offensive coordinator of Susquehanna University football team
Scot Dapp - Former head baseball coach at Susquehanna University
Gary Fincke - Author, poet, and former creative writing professor.
Jim Garrett - Former head football coach at Susquehanna University, former college football player, NFL player and assistant coach/scout. He is the father of former Dallas Cowboys head coach Jason Garrett (2010-2019).
Jonathan D. Green - President of Susquehanna 2017-
Jim Hazlett - Former head baseball and football coach
Ralph Mitterling - Former head football coach at Susquehanna University
William M. "Rocky" Rees - Former head football coach at Susquehanna University
Glen Retief - South African author and English and creative writing professor
Amos Alonzo Stagg - Former head football and basketball coach at Susquehanna University
Amos Alonzo Stagg Jr. - Former head football and basketball coach at Susquehanna University
Edgar Wingard - Former head football coach at Susquehanna University

References

External links

Official website
Official athletics website

 
Liberal arts colleges in Pennsylvania
Private universities and colleges in Pennsylvania
Universities and colleges in Snyder County, Pennsylvania
Educational institutions established in 1858
1858 establishments in Pennsylvania
Lutheranism in Pennsylvania
Eastern Pennsylvania Rugby Union